Kilnamadoo is a townland in County Fermanagh, Northern Ireland. It is situated within the civil parish of the area of Boho, as well as Fermanagh and Omagh district.

The Coal Bog road travels through this townland and the adjacent townland of Drumacoorin. This is a traditional peat cutting area and in past times was the main highway between Lough MacNean and Lough Erne. The area is particularly notable for the remnants of a Neolithic settlement found in the coal bog. An impressive bronze spearhead was also found in this area and is now on display in the National Museum of Ireland.

Neolithic site 
On 25 May 1880, a local person known as Mr Bothwell was cutting his turf when he unearthed the ancient site. He immediately sent for the archæologist Thomas Plunkett, who identified the remains as being a Neolithic settlement, situated on what was once an island or crannog in the midst of a body of water.

The settlement contained two oak wood huts, the larger measuring  square, and lay buried at least , below the original surface of the bog. The huts themselves were dated at this time to approximately 4000 years old. The modern whereabouts of this settlement are now unknown, but artefacts from the site are retained in the National Museum of Ireland, including the handle of a stone axe.

See also 
 List of townlands in County Fermanagh

References 

Townlands of County Fermanagh
Fermanagh and Omagh district